Sasuke is a Japanese sports entertainment reality show television series, airing since 1997, in which 100 competitors attempt to complete a four-stage obstacle course. An edited version, Ninja Warrior, is screened in at least 18 other countries.

Development
Recorded on location at Midoriyama studios in Yokohama, it airs on Tokyo Broadcasting System between Japanese television drama seasons. The show's name Sasuke is named after Sarutobi Sasuke, a fictitious character in Japanese storytelling. Each three-hour special (with the exceptions of Sasuke 24 and 36 which lasted 5  hours and 6 hours respectively) covers an entire competition; there are normally 100 participants. There have been 40 specials produced, approximately one new special per year (twice per year before Monster9's bankruptcy, now reduced to once per year since 2012, twice again in 2017 and 2018, then once a year since.). Until the 10th competition, Sasuke was broadcast as a special part of Muscle Ranking, but it became an independent program when Muscle Ranking was discontinued. The first competition was held indoors, marking the only time Sasuke did not take place outside. Competitions generally start in the daytime and continue until completed regardless of weather or darkness. After Monster9's bankruptcy in November 2011, all rights to the show fell completely into the hands of its broadcaster, Tokyo Broadcasting System. Following their acquisition of all rights to Sasuke, TBS renamed the show Sasuke Rising for the 28th, 29th and 30th editions, but have since reverted to the original name. TBS has renamed the show once again, to Sasuke Ninja Warrior since the 35th edition and changed the show's logo for the 36th edition, with the new logo's year being changed for subsequent editions.

Applicants are interviewed or auditioned and trial rounds are held to test their physical ability until the field is narrowed to 100 competitors. Sasuke consists of four stages of increasing difficulty; competitors must complete a stage to advance. Before the 18th tournament, a 1,200-meter run was held in order to determine the competitors' starting positions. Each competition is taped prior to the air date, edited for time, and broadcast as a three-hour show. Exceptions may be made as in Sasuke 24's case should TBS decide the broadcast should go over three hours, but this is a rare exception.

Format 
One hundred participants are given the opportunity to attempt the course. The object is to hit the buzzer at the end of each course before the allotted time expires. If a competitor goes out of bounds, runs out of time or comes into contact with the water in any of the pits below the course, they are disqualified from the competition.

First Stage 
The First Stage primarily tests one's speed. Typically, 85 to 90 of the 100 original entrants are eliminated in this stage. However, in the 4th competition, a record 37 of the original 100 competitors made it past the First Stage. After each full course completion, the First Stage was thoroughly redesigned to be much more difficult and prevent large numbers of people from moving on. 

In the 19th competition, only two competitors cleared the First Stage (neither of the two being Sasuke All-Stars), a record in Sasuke history.

2nd Stage 
Those with enough skill to complete Stage One then take on an even more grueling set of obstacles in Stage Two. 522 competitors have reached the Second Stage as of Sasuke 40. Like Stage One, the obstacles alter throughout the competitions. The obstacles determine the time limit, and it is usually between 50 and 100 seconds.

Unlike the First Stage, which has always required the competitors to hit a buzzer at the end of the course to stop the clock and pass the course, the Second Stage did not have a buzzer at its end until the 8th competition. Before then, the competitors simply walked through an open gate to stop the clock. From the 8th competition onward, the buzzer opens the gate. If the competitor breaks the gate open without hitting the button, they are disqualified. In addition, the course judges can hold the gates closed if a competitor committed a foul earlier in the Second Stage that would result in their disqualification, such as using the Chain Reaction gloves on the Spider Walk as Katsumi Yamada had done in the 12th competition.

On average, 10 to 15 competitors attempt the Second Stage on each competition. A record 37 competitors attempted the Second Stage during the 4th competition. Also during the 4th competition, 11 competitors cleared the Second Stage, a record that stood until Sasuke 40 saw 12 completions. In the 19th competition, neither of the two qualified competitors cleared the circuit (a fall and a timeout on the Salmon Ladder), marking the earliest end of a Sasuke competition.

3rd Stage 
The Third Stage has no time limit. Contestants are allowed approximately thirty seconds of rest between obstacles during which they can apply "sticky spray" to improve their grip. While the first two stages focus on speed and agility, this course almost exclusively tests one's upper body strength and stamina.

Out of 4,000 total competitors and 522 Second Stage competitors, 250 have attempted the Third Stage. The Third Stage is so grueling that, on average, someone passes it only every other competition. Only 28 individuals have ever passed it, and only seven have passed it more than once, namely Akira Omori, Shingo Yamamoto, Makoto Nagano, Yuuji Urushihara, Ryo Matachi, Yusuke Morimoto and Tatsuya Tada. The record for most Third Stage clears in a tournament is five, achieved in the 3rd and 24th tournaments.

Final stage 
To date, the Final Stage has known six forms. Each of these share a single, common goal: reach and hit the button at the top before time expires. If the competitor does not reach the top platform in time, the rope is cut and the competitor falls (they are caught by a safety line). Starting from the 18th competition, the rope is no longer cut. Reaching the top is referred to as kanzenseiha, translated roughly as "complete domination", and rendered on Ninja Warrior as "total victory". The Final Stage's time limit is between 30 and 45 seconds.

Notable competitors

Sasuke All-Stars 
The Sasuke All-Stars were a group of six favored competitors, established by the TBS network, originally thought to be the most likely to clear all four stages. Consisting of Shingo Yamamoto, Katsumi Yamada, Kazuhiko Akiyama, Toshihiro Takeda, Makoto Nagano and Bunpei Shiratori, they comprised a large portion of the competitors' success in the first decade of Sasuke. The first two champions, Akiyama and Nagano, are also included, as is the only competitor to compete in every tournament, Yamamoto.

The All-Stars were officially 'retired' in the 28th tournament, but this decision was reversed. Shingo Yamamoto continued to compete in Sasuke 29 and onwards. Takeda and Shiratori have since retired. Nagano retired in Sasuke 32, but has since made appearances in the 38th and 40th tournaments. Akiyama retired in Sasuke 28, but returned in the 40th tournament.

Sasuke New Stars (Shin Sedai) 
The Sasuke New Stars are younger competitors who made a name for themselves during the Shin-Sasuke era. "Shin Sedai" or New Stars became famous since Sasuke 17, after Shunsuke Nagasaki made it to the Final Stage. There was a brief hiatus before the term was re-popularized in Sasuke 22 when Yuuji and Kanno made it to the Third Stage. Membership in the Shin Sedai has been more fluid than the All-Stars, with Shunsuke Nagasaki, Yuuji Urushihara, Hitoshi Kanno, Koji Hashimoto, Jun Sato, Ryo Matachi, Kazuma Asa, Yusuke Morimoto, Tomohiro Kawaguchi, Shinya Kishimoto, Masashi Hioki and Yusuke Suzuki all having been considered members at certain points.

Morimoto Sedai 
The Morimoto Sedai is an informal term for the group of competitors who emerged post- Yusuke Morimoto's first kanzenseiha and are now some of the most consistently strong competitors. The members are usually considered to be Yusuke Morimoto, Tatsuya Tada, Keitaro Yamamoto, Jun Sato and Naoyuki Araki.

Celebrities 
Celebrity competitors include:

 Kanna Asakura, mixed martial artist (38, 40)
 Miki Ando, figure skater (39-40)
 Kenji Darvish, air drummer and member of Golden Bomber (28, 30-39)
 Tetsurō Degawa, comedian (19, 23-24)
 Yoshikazu Fujita, rugby player (38, 40)
 Fuwa-chan, comedian and YouTuber (39-40)
 Jessie Graff, stunt performer (34, 37, 40)
 Hikakin, YouTuber (39-40)
 Hori, impressionist (22-24)
 Kota Ibushi, wrestler (31-33)
 Eiko Kano, comedian (23-24, 26)
 Toshiaki Kasuga, comedian (22, 24, 38-40)
 Yoshio Kojima, comedian (22, 24, 26-28)
 Kane Kosugi, actor (1, 4, 6-8, 40)
 Daisuke Miyazaki, handballer (20-22, 26)
 Wataru Mori, actor (16, 21, 32-37)
 Akiyoshi Nakao, actor (20, 22)
 Daisuke Nakata, Olympic trampolinist (8-13, 16-17, 21)
 Naoto, member of Exile (26)
 Sugeta Rinne, member of 7 Men Samurai (38-40)
 Tetsuji Sakakibara, singer and member of Yoshimotozaka46 (23-26)
 Dandy Sakano, comedian (24-25)
 Shōei, actor (6-8)
 Bobby Ologun, mixed martial artist (22)
 Andy Ologun, mixed martial artist (18, 20)
 Paul Terek, Olympic decathlete (17, 19, 22, 24)
 Ryoichi Tsukada, member of A.B.C-Z (31-40)
 Ryosuke Yamamoto, actor (30-31)
 Passion Yara, comedian (16, 21)
 Kyan Yutaka, air guitarist and member of Golden Bomber (31-33, 35-36, 39-40)

Results
In its 40 editions, all four stages of the course have been completed a total of only six times, by four different competitors. These were Kazuhiko Akiyama in the 4th competition (1999), Makoto Nagano in the 17th competition (2006), Yuuji Urushihara in the 24th (2010) and 27th (2011) competitions, and Yusuke Morimoto in the 31st  (2015) and 38th (2020) competitions.

See also

 Kinniku Banzuke (known in the United States as Unbeatable Banzuke)
 Kunoichi (women's version of Sasuke)
 Viking: The Ultimate Obstacle Course
 Sarutobi Sasuke
 Australian Ninja Warrior
 Ninja Warrior Germany
 Ninja Warrior UK
 American Ninja Warrior

References

External links
 Sasuke 2007 (Sasuke 2007 Autumn) – Tokyo Broadcasting System 
 Sasuke 2006秋 (Sasuke 2006 Autumn) – Tokyo Broadcasting System 
 Sasuke 2005・(Sasuke 2005 Winter) – Tokyo Broadcasting System 
 Diagrams of the 11th course with measurements – Tokyo Broadcasting System 
 Ninja Warrior on Challenge
 

 
Japanese game shows
Obstacle racing television game shows
1997 Japanese television series debuts
1990s Japanese television series
2000s Japanese television series
2010s Japanese television series
TBS Television (Japan) original programming
Ninja Warrior (franchise)
Television franchises